The hammer and sickle (Unicode: "☭") is a symbol meant to represent proletarian solidarity, a union between agricultural and industrial workers. It was first adopted during the Russian Revolution at the end of World War I, the hammer representing workers and the sickle representing the peasants.

After World War I (from which the Russian Empire withdrew in 1917) and the Russian Civil War, the hammer and sickle became more widely used as a symbol for labor within the Soviet Union and for international proletarian unity. It was taken up by many communist movements around the world, some with local variations. Following the dissolution of the Soviet Union at the end of the Cold War, the hammer and sickle remains commonplace in Russia and other former Soviet republics. In some other former communist countries, as well as in countries where communism is banned by law, its display is prohibited as part of decommunization policies. The hammer and sickle is also commonplace in later self-declared socialist states such as Cuba, China, North Korea, Vietnam, and Laos.

History

Worker symbolism 
Farm and worker instruments and tools have long been used as symbols for proletarian struggle.

The combination of hammer and sickle symbolised the combination of farmers and construction workers. One example of use prior to its political instrumentalization by the Soviet Union is found in Chilean currency circulating since 1894.

An alternative example is the combination of a hammer and a plough, with the same meaning (unity of peasants and workers). In Ireland, the symbol of the plough remains in use. The Starry Plough banner was originally used by the Irish Citizen Army, a socialist republican workers' militia. James Connolly, who co-founded the Irish Citizen Army with Jack White, said the significance of the banner was that a free Ireland would control its own destiny from the plough to the stars. A sword is forged into the plough to symbolise the end of war with the establishment of a Socialist International. That was unveiled in 1914 and flown by the Irish Citizen Army during the 1916 Easter Rising.

Inception 
In 1917, Vladimir Lenin and Anatoly Lunacharsky held a competition to create a Soviet emblem. The winning design was a hammer and sickle on top of a globe in rays of the sun, surrounded by a wreath of grain and under a five-pointed star, with the inscription "proletarians of the world, unite!" in six languages (Russian, Ukrainian, Belarusian, Georgian, Armenian and Azerbaijani). It originally featured a sword, but Lenin strongly objected, disliking the violent connotations. The winning designer was Yevgeny Ivanovich Kamzolkin (1885–1957).

On 6 July 1923, the 2nd session of the Central Executive Committee (CIK) adopted the emblem. In his work, Daily Life in a Crumbling Empire: The Absorption of Russia into the World Economy, sociologist David Lempert hypothesizes that the hammer and sickle was a secular replacement for the patriarchal cross.

Use in Soviet Union 
 The State Emblem of the Soviet Union and the Coats of Arms of the Soviet Republics showed the hammer and sickle, which also appeared on the red star badge on the uniform cap of the Red Army uniform and in many other places.
 Serp i Molot is also the name of a stop on the electric railway line from Kurski railway station in Moscow to Gorky, featured in Venedikt Yerofeyev's novel, Moscow-Petushki.

Meaning 
At the time of creation, the hammer and sickle stood for worker-peasant alliance, with the hammer a traditional symbol of the industrial proletariat (who dominated the proletariat of Russia) and the sickle a traditional symbol for the peasantry, but the meaning has since broadened to a globally recognizable symbol for Marxism, communist parties, or socialist states.

Current usage

Post-Soviet states 

Two federal subjects of the post-Soviet Russian Federation use the hammer and sickle in their symbols: the Vladimir Oblast has them on its flag and the Bryansk Oblast has them on its flag and coat of arms, which is also the central element of its flag. In addition, the Russian city of Oryol also uses the hammer and sickle on its flag.

The former Soviet (now Russian) national airline, Aeroflot, continues to use the hammer and sickle in its symbol.

Many commercially available ushanka hats, especially those marketed as “Russian hats”, bear a Soviet-style hammer and sickle emblem.

The de facto government of Transnistria uses (with minor modifications) the flag and the emblem of the former Moldavian SSR, which includes the hammer and sickle. The flag can also appear without the hammer and sickle in some circumstances, for example on Transnistrian-issued license plates.

Communist parties 
Three out of the five currently ruling Communist parties use a hammer and sickle as the party symbol: the Chinese Communist Party, the Communist Party of Vietnam and the Lao People's Revolutionary Party. In Laos and Vietnam, the hammer and sickle party flags can often be seen flying side by side with their respective national flags.

Many communist parties around the world also use it, including the Communist Party of Greece, the Communist Party of Chile, both the Communist Party of Brazil and the Brazilian Communist Party, the Purba Banglar Sarbahara Party from Bangladesh, the Communist Party of Sri Lanka, the Communist Party of India (Marxist), the Communist Party of India (Marxist–Leninist) Liberation, the Communist Party of India, the Communist Party of India (Maoist), the Indian Communist Marxist Party, the Socialist Unity Centre of India (Communist), the Egyptian Communist Party, the Communist Party of Pakistan, the Communist Refoundation Party in Italy, the Communist Party of Spain, the Communist Party of Denmark, the Communist Party of Norway, the Romanian Communist Party, the Lebanese Communist Party, the Communist Party of the Philippines and the Shining Path. The Communist Party of Sweden, the Portuguese Communist Party and the Mexican Communist Party use the hammer and sickle imposed on the red star.

Variations 
Many symbols having similar structures and messages to the original have been designed. For example, the Angolan flag shows a segment of a cog, crossed by a machete and crowned with a socialist star while the flag of Mozambique features an AK-47 crossed by a hoe. In the logo of the Communist Party USA, a circle is formed by a half cog and a semicircular sickle-blade. A hammer is laid directly over the sickle's handle with the hammer's head at the logo's center. The logo of the Communist Party of Turkey consists of half a cog wheel crossed by a hammer, with a star on the top.

Tools represented in other designs include: the brush, sickle and hammer of the Workers' Party of Korea; the spade, flaming torch and quill used prior to 1984 by the British Labour Party; the pickaxe and rifle used in communist Albania; and the hammer and compasses of the East German emblem and flag. The Far Eastern Republic of Russia used an anchor crossed over a spade or pickaxe, symbolising the union of the fishermen and miners. The Fourth International, founded by Leon Trotsky, uses a hammer and sickle symbol on which the number 4 is superimposed. The hammer and sickle in the Fourth International symbol are the opposite of other hammer and sickle symbols in that the head of the hammer is on the right side and the sickle end tip on the left. The Trotskyist League for the Fifth International merges a hammer with the number 5, using the number's lower arch to form the sickle. A sickle with a rifle is also used by the People's Mojahedin of Iran.

The Communist Party of Britain uses the hammer and dove symbol. Designed in 1988 by Michal Boncza, it is intended to highlight the party's connection to the peace movement. It is usually used in conjunction with the hammer and sickle and it appears on all of the CPB's publications. Some members of the CPB prefer one symbol over the other, although the party's 1994 congress reaffirmed the hammer and dove's position as the official emblem of the party. Similarly, the Communist Party of Israel uses a dove over the hammer and sickle as its symbol. The flag of the Guadeloupe Communist Party uses a sickle, turned to look like a majuscule G, to represent Guadeloupe.

The flag of the Black Front, a Strasserist group founded by early Nazi Party members and expelled around the time of the Night of the Long Knives purge, along with his supporters and the Sturmabteilung and originator of the ideology and the Black Front himself Otto Strasser, featured a crossed hammer and sword, symbolizing the unity of the workers and military.

In 1938, the Dobama Asiayone, an anti-British nationalist group in the then British Burma, adopted a tricolour flag charged with red sickle and hammer. From 1974–2010, the flag of Burma (Myanmar) featured a bushel of rice superimposed on a cogwheel surrounded by fourteen white stars; the rice representing the peasants and the cogwheel representing the workers, the combination symbolizing that the peasants and workers be the two basic social classes for State building, while the fourteen equal-sized white stars indicate the unity and equality of fourteen member states of the Union.

The flag of Chama Cha Mapinduzi (CCM, Party of the Revolution in Swahili), currently the ruling political party of Tanzania, has a slightly different symbol with a hammer and a hoe (jembe) instead of a sickle to represent the most common farm tool in Africa.

The National Bolshevik Party used the hammer and sickle in their flag, but colored black instead of gold and in a design similar to the Nazi flag, a brighter red flag than the USSR, with a black hammer and sickle on a white disk in the center.

The symbols of the liberal socialist parties of Radical Civic Union in Argentina and the Czech National Social Party in the Czech Republic features a hammer and a quill with the former representing workers and the latter representing clerks.

The election symbol of Communist Party of India consists of a horizontal sickle, vertically crossed by Ears of Corn  in the center. Election Symbol of Communist Party of India (1964-present)

Art 
The hammer and sickle has long been a common theme in socialist realism, but it has also seen some depiction in non-Marxist popular culture. Andy Warhol who created many drawings and photographs of the hammer and sickle is the most famous example of this.

Legal status 

In several countries in the former Eastern Bloc, there are laws that define the hammer and sickle as the symbol of a "totalitarian and criminal ideology" and the public display of the hammer and sickle and other Communist symbols such as the red star is considered a criminal offence. Georgia, Hungary, Latvia, Lithuania, Moldova (1 October 2012 – 4 June 2013) and Ukraine have banned communist symbols including this one. A similar law was considered in Estonia, but it eventually failed in a parliamentary committee. In Ukraine, the legislature equals communist symbols including hammer with sickle to Nazi swastika symbols.

In 2010, the Lithuanian, Latvian, Bulgarian, Hungarian, Romanian, and Czech governments called for the European Union to criminalize "the approval, denial or belittling of communist crimes" similar to how a number of EU member states have banned Holocaust denial. The European Commission turned down this request, finding after a study that the criteria for EU-wide criminal legislation were not met, leaving individual member states to determine the extent to which they wished to handle past totalitarian crimes.

In February 2013, the Constitutional Court of Hungary annulled the ban on the use of symbols of fascist and communist dictatorships, including the hammer and sickle, the red star and the swastika, saying the ban was too broad and imprecise. The court also pointed to a judgement of the European Court of Human Rights in which Hungary was found guilty of violation of article 10, the right to freedom of expression. In June 2013, the Constitutional Court of Moldova ruled that the Moldovan Communist Party’s symbols—the hammer and sickle—are legal and can be used.

In Indonesia, the display of communist symbols is banned and the country's Communist party was also banned by decree of president Suharto, following the 1965–1966 killings of communists in which over 500,000 people were killed. In January 2018, an activist protesting against Bumi Resources displayed the hammer and sickle, was accused of spreading communism, and later jailed.

In Poland, dissemination of items which are "media of fascist, communist or other totalitarian symbolism" was criminalized in 1997. However, the Constitutional Tribunal found this sanction to be unconstitutional in 2011.

Usage

Flags

Europe

Asia

Africa

Americas

State emblems

Soviet Union (in the constitutional order)

Other

Logos

Europe

Asia

Africa

Americas

Unicode 
In Unicode, the "hammer and sickle" symbol is U+262D (☭). It is part of the Miscellaneous Symbols (2600–26FF) code block. On systems where Compose key is available, it could be written as [Compose]+CCCP. It was added to Unicode 1.1 in 1993.

See also 

 Arm and hammer
 Fist and rose
 Communist symbolism
 Socialist heraldry
 Hammer and pick (⚒)
 Red flag (⚑)
 Red star (★)
 Transport and Map Symbols Unicode block (contains 🛠 "hammer and wrench" as U+1F6E0)

Notes

References

External links 
 
 

 
Heraldic charges
National symbols of Armenia
National symbols of Azerbaijan
National symbols of Belarus
National symbols of Georgia (country)
National symbols of Kazakhstan
National symbols of Kyrgyzstan
National symbols of Laos
National symbols of Moldova
National symbols of Russia
National symbols of Tajikistan
National symbols of the People's Republic of China
National symbols of the Soviet Union
National symbols of Turkmenistan
National symbols of Ukraine
National symbols of Uzbekistan
Symbols of communism